Marco Zanon (born 3 October 1997 in Bassano del Grappa, Italy) is a rugby union player for Benetton. His preferred position is Centre.

Biography
In 2017–18 Pro14 season, during his experience with Top10 team Mogliano, he was named as Permit Player for Benetton in Pro 14. From 2018 to 2022 he played for Benetton full time.
From March to June 2022, he played as Joker medical for Section Paloise.

After playing for Italy Under 20 in 2016 and 2017, in 2018 Zanon was named in the Emerging Italy squad for the World Rugby Nations Cup. On 24 January 2019, Zanon was named in Italy's squad for the 2019 Six Nations.

Personal life
He is engaged to the triple jumper Ottavia Cestonaro.

References

External links

Living people
1997 births
People from Bassano del Grappa
Italian rugby union players
Benetton Rugby players
Sportspeople from the Province of Vicenza
Italy A national rugby union team players
Italy international rugby union players
Mogliano Rugby players
Section Paloise players
Rugby union centres